
Gmina Miasteczko Krajeńskie is an urban-rural gmina (administrative district) in Piła County, Greater Poland Voivodeship, in west-central Poland.

Villages
Apart from the town of Miasteczko Krajeńskie, Gmina Miasteczko Krajeńskie contains the villages and settlements of Arentowo, Brzostowo, Grabionna, Grabówno, Miasteczko-Huby, Okaliniec, Solnówek and Wolsko.

Neighbouring gminas
Gmina Miasteczko Krajeńskie is bordered by the gminas of Białośliwie, Chodzież, Kaczory, Szamocin and Wysoka.

References
Polish official population figures 2006

Miasteczko Krajenskie
Piła County